Transparency International's 2021 Corruption Perceptions Index scored Germany at 80 on a scale from 0 ("highly corrupt") to 100 ("highly clean"). When ranked by score, Germany ranked 10th among the 180 countries in the Index, where the country ranked first is perceived to have the most honest public sector.  For comparison, the best score was 88 (ranked 1), and the worst score was 11 (ranked 180).

Transparency International’s Global Corruption Barometer 2013 reveals that political parties and businesses are the most corrupt institutions in Germany. The same report also indicates that petty corruption is not as common as in other European countries. The survey shows that 11% of the respondents claim to have been asked to pay a bribe at one point in their life and only few of those said that they had refused to pay the bribe.

According to Freedom House's report, Germany’s ability to ensure integrity and to prevent corruption in state bodies is generally sufficient due to a strong institutional setup.

Regarding business and corruption, business executives from World Economic Forum Global Competitiveness Report 2013-2014 consider tax regulations and restrictive labour regulations as the most problematic factors for doing business. They also report that trust in the ethical standards of politicians is relatively high, and that irregular payments and bribes only rarely take place in relation to public services.

See also 
 CDU donations scandal
 Crime in Germany
 Flick affair
 Group of States Against Corruption
 Lobbying in Germany
 International Anti-Corruption Academy
 International Anti-Corruption Day
 ISO 37001 Anti-bribery management systems
 OECD Anti-Bribery Convention
 Transparency International
 United Nations Convention against Corruption

References

 
Ger
Ger
Politics of Germany
Crime in Germany by type